System Preferences is an EP by New York City-based electronic music artist Rioux, released on 21 April 2014.

Credits
 Erin Rioux - Recording, producing, performing, mixing, mastering and artwork
 Grant Jefferson - Juno synthesizer on "Tree Torrent"

Track listing

See also
 2014 in music

External links 
 Official Bandcamp page for the EP

2014 EPs